Nalin & Kane are a German production and remixing team, comprising Andry Nalin (born Andreas Bialek, 14 May 1969) and Harry Kane (born Ralf Beck; 21 November 1966). Their international breakthrough came with the Ibiza anthem, "Beachball", in mid 1997.

Biography
The duo began working together in 1993 as Nalin Inc. and released their first 12-inch single, "Planet Orange", in 1994. They began their own label, Superfly Records in 1995, releasing the singles "The K-People" and "Backfire" before the turning point came with "Beachball".  They have since had success with remixes of Energy 52's "Café Del Mar", Da Hool's "Meet Her at the Love Parade" and Lustral's "Everytime".  In late 1999, they released their debut album, Krystal Palace.

"Beachball" was notable for topping the club charts in many countries during its time of release. Like the majority of dance releases, the track has been remixed several times but none have come close to repeating the success of the original version. A cover version by Burnette was released at the same time, leading to two versions competing for chart position.

The track "Open Your Eyes" is featured on Tiësto's In Search of Sunrise 3. The original track "Open Your Eyes" was produced by At the Villa People in 1996, in Belgium.

Discography

Albums

Nalin & Kane
 2001: The Remixes

Nalin I.N.C.
 2002: Different Affairs

Singles

Nalin & Kane

Nalin I.N.C.
 1993: "Apalusa"
 1994: "Planet Orange"
 1995: "Call U"
 1996: "Condensed EP"
 1997: "Planet Violet" - UK #51, Germany #37
 1999: "Magic Fly"
 2002: "Scream" - Germany #73
 2002: "African Harvest"
 2003: "Planet Violet 2003"

Yellow Cab
 1995: "Touch Myself"

References

External links
Yahoo Music Biography

German house music groups
German electronic music groups
German dance music groups
German musical duos
Electronic dance music duos